Songdo Central Park is a public park in the Songdo district of Incheon, South Korea. The park is the centerpiece of Songdo IBD's green space plan, inspired by New York City's Central Park.   Central Park is a public zone in the center of Korea's first international city, covering 101 acres (41 hectares); the park covers almost 10% of Songdo IBD’s total area.  It serves to connect to various civic and cultural destinations by providing a seawater canal that refreshes itself every 24 hours.  The park also displays sculpture and artwork such as the swooping neofuturistic metallic architecture of the Tri-Bowl.

Amenities
The park has become popular with families in Songdo and Incheon, and draws day-visitors from the Seoul area. The forested area in the park also fills with daytime tents and campers on weekends. A patio on the east side of the park has cafes and small restaurants, and canoes are available for rental. A water-taxi service crosses the lake for transportation and tourism.

Central Park is accessible from the nearby Canal Walk shopping court or by Central Park Station of Incheon Metro Line 1.

In popular culture
Several scenes of the 2012 Gangnam Style music video by Psy were filmed in Songdo Central Park. First, there was a scene in the underground parking lot. This was where Psy had a dance battle with Yoo Jae-suk, who was wearing a yellow suit. In addition, there was another shot taken in the elevator of the same building. There Noh Hong-chul thrust his pelvis while Psy was rapping below him as the elevator door closes.

Gallery 

 Songdo Central Park Walk tour VR Video

References

External links
 Songdo Central Park
 Map of Central Park

Parks in Incheon
Songdo International Business District
Venues of the 2014 Asian Games
2009 establishments in South Korea